The 2012–13 season is the 17th edition of Europe's premier basketball tournament for women – EuroLeague Women since it was rebranded to its current format.

Regular season
Regular season groups started on 24 October 2012 and finished on 6 February 2013.

Group A

Group B

Group C

Round 2
Game 1 will be played on 19 February 2013. Game 2 will be played on 22 February 2013. Game 3 will be played on 27 February 2013. The team that won two games first, advanced to the quarterfinals. UMMC Ekaterinburg qualified directly to the quarterfinals as hoster of the Final Eight.

Final eight

Quarter-final round
The Final Eight will be held in Yekaterinburg. The Quarter-Final Round will be played in a round robin system with two groups of four teams. The two group winners will advance to the Semi-Final Round.

Group A

Group B

Semi-final round
DIVS Sport Hall, Yekaterinburg, Russia

Semifinal 1

Semifinal 2

Third-place

Final

Stats leaders in regular season

Points

Rebounds

Assists

References

External links
 FIBA Europe

    
2012–13